The Grand Dream Development Party (GDDP) is a political party in Kenya.

History 
The party endorsed Mwangi wa Iria in the 2022 Kenyan presidential election. One member of the National Assembly was elected in the 2022 general election

References 

Political parties in Kenya